Bucaq, Yevlakh (also, Budzhak, Yevlakh) may refer to:
Aşağı Bucaq, Azerbaijan
Yuxarı Bucaq, Azerbaijan

See also
 Budjak (disambiguation)
 Bucak (disambiguation)
 Bujak (disambiguation)